Orazjin (also Romanized as Orāzjīn) is a village in Afshariyeh Rural District, Khorramdasht District, Takestan County, Qazvin Province, Iran. At the time of the 2006 census, its population was 1,012, in 225 families.

References 

Populated places in Takestan County